The A. W. Hayden House is a historic home in Albuquerque, New Mexico, United States. It was built in 1920 by A. W. Hayden, who was a local contractor and probably constructed the house himself. The property was added to the New Mexico State Register of Cultural Properties in 1979 and the National Register of Historic Places in 1980. It is a one-story, brick Craftsman style house with an unusual roofline consisting of three stepped, front-facing gables. Each gable has shingled gable ends, overhanging eaves supported by wooden brackets, and exposed rafter ends. The house also has 1-over-1 sash windows and an enclosed porch.

References

American Craftsman architecture in New Mexico
Houses completed in 1920
Houses in Albuquerque, New Mexico
Houses on the National Register of Historic Places in New Mexico
National Register of Historic Places in Albuquerque, New Mexico
New Mexico State Register of Cultural Properties